Amber Hood is an American voice actress in animation and video games.

Selected credits

Animation
 Blaze and the Monster Machines — Monkey
 Blood+ — Kaori Kinjo (English dub)
 Codename: Kids Next Door — Jessica
 Doc McStuffins — Susie Sunshine
 Danger Rangers — Andy, Boy, and Pauley
 The Grim Adventures of Billy and Mandy — Sassy Cat, Cassie
 The Lion Guard — Kijana
 Oh Yeah! Cartoons — Tootie
 Justice League — Little Girl
 Rugrats — Cassie
 Shimmer and Shine — Female Elf
 Special Agent Oso — Special Agent Dotty
 Regular Show — All Huggstables except Huggstable #4
 Diva Starz — Summer
 Seasons of Giving - Kessie

Video games
 Ape Escape 3 — Natalie (English dub)
 Ape Escape: On the Loose — Natalie (English dub)
 Baldur's Gate — Alora, Dryad, Nymph, Tenya
 Code Name: S.T.E.A.M. — Dorothy (English dub)
 De Blob — Inky, Blobs
 Diablo III — Additional Voices (Uncredited)
 Diablo III: Reaper of Souls — Additional Voices
 EverQuest II — Baker Voleen, Tabby Copperpot, Defender Camis
 Final Fantasy XIII-2 — Paddra Nsu-Yeul (English dub)
 Fire Emblem Heroes — Nyx (English dub)
 Free Realms — Pixie
 Gurumin: A Monstrous Adventure  — Parin (English dub)
 Heroes of the Storm  — Brightwing
 La Pucelle: Tactics — Princess Éclair (English dub)
 Lightning Returns: Final Fantasy XIII — Paddra Nsu-Yeul (English dub)
 Lineage II — Female Dwarf (English dub)
 Nicktoons: Attack of the Toybots — Minion
 Nicktoons: Battle for Volcano Island — Little Crab
 Onimusha 3: Demon Siege — Ako (English dub)
 The Polar Express — Girl in Green Pajamas
 Psychonauts — Little Oly/Second Rainbow Squirt
 Psychonauts 2 — Moth, Nurse Bell, Pinky Worm, and Mirtala Aquato
 Ratchet and Clank Future: A Crack in Time — Fongoid Child #1
 Sekiro: Shadows Die Twice — Kuro and the Divine Child
 Shark Tale — Shortie #2, Teen Girl Fish, Groupie Fish #2
 Valkyria Chronicles II — Aliasse (English dub)
 White Knight Chronicles — Additional voices (English dub)

References

External links
 

Living people
American voice actresses
American video game actresses
Place of birth missing (living people)
Year of birth missing (living people)
21st-century American women